Lawrence Joseph Roberds Foyt (born February 22, 1977) is an American former NASCAR and IndyCar driver. He is the biological grandson and adopted son of A. J. Foyt, and a biological cousin (and uncle by adoption) of A. J. Foyt IV. His biological mother (and sister by adoption) is Terry Lynn Foyt, daughter of A. J. Foyt, who divorced his biological father Larry Gene Roberds when he was an infant. He also drove in the 2004, 2005, and the 2006 Indianapolis 500 for A. J. Foyt Enterprises.

Racing career

Early career
Foyt began racing in 1993 in the go-kart ranks, and won his first race two years later. He would win the state championship in his first year in 125cc competition one year later. In 1997, he began running USAC's Formula 2000 series. He won two races in the SCCA series in 1999. The next year, he made his stock car racing debut in the American Speed Association, where he won a pole at Winchester Speedway and had four top-tens. In addition, he made his first attempt at a Winston Cup race at Atlanta Motor Speedway in his father's backup car, but missed the field. The same year, he graduated from Texas Christian University with a degree in communications.

NASCAR
In 2001, Foyt moved to the Busch Series, driving the No. 14 Harrah's Chevrolet Monte Carlo. He had five top-twenties and finished 22nd in points, third in the Rookie of the Year championship. The next year, he had two top-tens and finished 20th in points. He moved to Cup full-time in 2003, and had a best finish of 16th at Homestead-Miami Speedway, finishing 41st in points. After the team lost its Harrah's sponsorship, Foyt ran just three races before the team closed its doors.

In 2005, Foyt ran one race in ARCA and finished 12th in the race. He ended up missing most of the season after suffering back injuries in a crash in the Indy 500. He hoped to make the Daytona 500 in the No. 50 owned by Arnold Motorsports, but missed the race. Early in the season, he announced the formation of his own Busch Series team, but after sponsorship failed to materialize, the team dissolved. He also ran the Indianapolis 500 again, finishing 30th after suffering handling problems.

A. J. Foyt announced in July 2006 that Larry would be assuming more management responsibilities at A. J. Foyt Enterprises and eventually assume the role of team manager by the end of the 2007 season. He returned to NASCAR driving the No. 44 Key Motorsports Chevy with sponsorship from Silestone by Cosentino for one race, but wrecked early in the 2007 Chevy Silverado HD 250, finishing 32nd. He attempted the Pepsi 400 in NEXTEL Cup with BAM Racing, however qualifying was rained out, forcing him to miss the race. He competed that weekend in the Daytona Busch Series race for Mac Hill Racing, finishing 38th after a wreck. He made his second career Craftsman Truck race in 2008 at Daytona, starting 36th and finishing 18th.

Foyt attempted both the Nationwide and Camping World Truck races at Daytona in 2009, for Mac Hill Motorsports and Derrike Cope, Inc., respectively. He failed to qualify for the Nationwide Series race and finished 20th, 15 laps down, in the Truck Series race.

Motorsports career results

NASCAR
(key) (Bold – Pole position awarded by qualifying time. Italics – Pole position earned by points standings or practice time. * – Most laps led.)

Nextel Cup Series

Daytona 500

Nationwide Series

Camping World Truck Series

ARCA Re/Max Series
(key) (Bold – Pole position awarded by qualifying time. Italics – Pole position earned by points standings or practice time. * – Most laps led.)

IndyCar Series

Indy 500 results

References

External links

 
 

1977 births
American adoptees
American Speed Association drivers
ARCA Menards Series drivers
Indianapolis 500 drivers
IndyCar Series drivers
Living people
NASCAR drivers
Racing drivers from Houston
Texas Christian University alumni
U.S. F2000 National Championship drivers
A. J. Foyt Enterprises drivers